PERS may refer to:

 Personal Emergency Response System
 The Oregon Public Employees Retirement System or another similarly named program. See Public employee pension plans in the United States.